Demba Thiam (born 2 December 1989) is a French footballer who plays as a leftback for Dunkerque.

Professional career
Thiam made his professional debut with Dunkerque in a 1-0 Ligue 2 win over Toulouse FC on 22 August 2020.

Personal life
Born in France, Thiam is of Senegalese descent.

References

External links
 
 Foot National Profile

1989 births
Living people
Footballers from Strasbourg
French footballers
French sportspeople of Senegalese descent
Association football fullbacks
AS Beauvais Oise players
R.E. Virton players
CS Sedan Ardennes players
USL Dunkerque players
Ligue 2 players
Championnat National players
Championnat National 2 players
Challenger Pro League players
French expatriate footballers
French expatriates in Belgium
Expatriate footballers in Belgium